SLB Laulara or  Associação Desportiva e Sport Laulara e Benfica is a football team from Laulara, Aileu District, Timor-Leste, that plays in the Liga Futebol Amadora.

Squad List 
Updated September 2020.

Hounors
Liga Futebol Amadora Primeira Divisaun champions : 2016

Competition records

Super Liga 
2005-06: 2nd Round

Liga Futebol Amadora 
2016: Champions
2017: 4th place
2018: 5th place
2019: 5th place

Taça 12 de Novembro
2016: Semifinals
2017: Semifinals
2018: Semifinals
2019: Runner-up

LFA Super Taça
2016: Runner-up

Sponsors
TL Cement
Torpedo Drink
Mizone

Affiliated clubs
 Benfica
 Sport Benfica e Castelo Branco
 Benfica F.C.
 Benfica

References

Football clubs in East Timor
Football
Aileu Municipality